Mohamed Berthé (born September 12, 1972, in Bacato, Guinea) is a retired French professional football player. He also holds Guinean citizenship.

References

1972 births
Living people
French footballers
French expatriate footballers
Expatriate footballers in England
AFC Bournemouth players
Expatriate footballers in Scotland
Scottish Premier League players
Heart of Midlothian F.C. players
Raith Rovers F.C. players
Expatriate footballers in Belgium
Belgian Pro League players
Cercle Brugge K.S.V. players
S.V. Zulte Waregem players
Expatriate footballers in Réunion
Paris Saint-Germain F.C. players
West Ham United F.C. players
La Tamponnaise players
Olympique Noisy-le-Sec players
K.V.K. Tienen-Hageland players
Association football defenders